The meridian 134° west of Greenwich is a line of longitude that extends from the North Pole across the Arctic Ocean, North America, the Pacific Ocean, the Southern Ocean, and Antarctica to the South Pole.

The 134th meridian west forms a great circle with the 46th meridian east.

From Pole to Pole
Starting at the North Pole and heading south to the South Pole, the 134th meridian west passes through:

{| class="wikitable plainrowheaders"
! scope="col" width="130" | Co-ordinates
! scope="col" | Country, territory or sea
! scope="col" | Notes
|-
| style="background:#b0e0e6;" | 
! scope="row" style="background:#b0e0e6;" | Arctic Ocean
| style="background:#b0e0e6;" |
|-
| style="background:#b0e0e6;" | 
! scope="row" style="background:#b0e0e6;" | Beaufort Sea
| style="background:#b0e0e6;" |
|-valign="top"
| 
! scope="row" | 
| Northwest Territories — Richards Island and mainland Yukon — for about 2 km from  Northwest Territories — for about 8 km from  Yukon — from  British Columbia — from 
|-
| 
! scope="row" | 
| Alaska — Alaska Panhandle (mainland) and Admiralty Island
|-
| style="background:#b0e0e6;" | 
! scope="row" style="background:#b0e0e6;" | Frederick Sound
| style="background:#b0e0e6;" |
|-
| 
! scope="row" | 
| Alaska — Kupreanof Island and Kuiu Island
|-valign="top"
| style="background:#b0e0e6;" | 
! scope="row" style="background:#b0e0e6;" | Pacific Ocean
| style="background:#b0e0e6;" | Passing between Coronation Island and Warren Island, Alaska,  Passing just west of Noyes Island, Alaska, 
|-
| style="background:#b0e0e6;" | 
! scope="row" style="background:#b0e0e6;" | Southern Ocean
| style="background:#b0e0e6;" |
|-
| 
! scope="row" | Antarctica
| Unclaimed territory
|-
|}

See also
133rd meridian west
135th meridian west

w134 meridian west